The eastern nannygai (Centroberyx affinis), also known as the redfish, bight redfish, red snapper, golden snapper or koarea, is an alfonsino of the genus Centroberyx. It can reach lengths of up to  SL. It forms schools near the sea floor over rocky reefs and mud at dawn and dusk, splitting up at night to feed on mollusks, crustaceans, and small fish. Its young live in estuaries and shallow coastal waters.

Exploited commercially in New South Wales and South Australia, nannygai are considered to be excellent table fish.

References

 
 Tony Ayling & Geoffrey Cox, Collins Guide to the Sea Fishes of New Zealand,  (William Collins Publishers Ltd, Auckland, New Zealand 1982)

External links
 Fishes of Australia : Centroberyx affinis

eastern nannygai
Marine fish of Eastern Australia
Fish of New Zealand
eastern nannygai
eastern nannygai